Lianne is a female given name, sometimes short for Juliana, (and can therefore mean youthful or dedicated to Jupiter) or a combination of Lia and Anna. The name "Lianne" is also French for "climbing vine". It may refer to;

 Lianne Dalziel, New Zealand politician;
 Lianne Hall, English folk/electronic singer
 Lianne La Havas, English singer and songwriter;
 Lianne Mars, fictional character from television series Veronica Mars;
 Lianne Sanderson, English women's footballer;
 Lianne Sheppard, American statistician (short for Elizabeth Anne)
 Lianne Shirley, New Zealand badminton player.
 Lianne Sobey, Canadian curler
 Lianne Tan, Belgian badminton player

English given names
Feminine given names